Vlad Popescu Piedone (born September 16, 1989, Bucharest, Romania) is a Romanian deputy, elected in 2020 from the PSD.

References

Living people
1989 births
Members of the Chamber of Deputies (Romania)
Social Democratic Party (Romania) politicians
Politicians from Bucharest
21st-century Romanian politicians